Jeffers Warrington (born 19 November 1943) is a Dominica cricketer. He played in thirteen first-class matches for the Leeward Islands from 1968 to 1971.

See also
 List of Leeward Islands first-class cricketers

References

External links
 

1943 births
Living people
Dominica cricketers
Leeward Islands cricketers